Sufian Deh (also Romanized as Şūfīān Deh) is a village in Hend Khaleh Rural District, Tulem District, Sowme'eh Sara County, Gilan Province, Iran. At the 2006 census, its population was 809, in 231 families.

References 

Populated places in Sowme'eh Sara County